Herbert I. Leeds (September 13, 1900 – May 15, 1954) was an American film director.

Biography
Herbert Irving Levy was born on September 13, 1900, to Abraham T. Levy and had a sister, Marjorie Levy Rudman. He married Evelyn C. and had Lydia as their child.

Leeds was employed by Twentieth Century Fox, for whom he directed a number of lower-budget films such as Mr. Moto on Danger Island (1939).  He was credited under a variety of different names during his career, as Herbert Levy and Bert Levy.

He died on May 15, 1954, in Manhattan, New York City.

Selected filmography
 Five of a Kind (1938)
 Charlie Chan in City in Darkness (1939)
 Mr. Moto in Danger Island (1939)
 Romance of the Rio Grande (1941)
 Manila Calling (1942)
 It Shouldn't Happen to a Dog (1946)
 Bunco Squad (1950)

References

Bibliography 
 Youngkin, Stephen. The Lost One: A Life of Peter Lorre. University Press of Kentucky, 2005.

External links 
 

1900 births
1954 deaths
American film editors
Film directors from New York City